Gregory So Kam-leung is the former Secretary for Commerce and Economic Development of Hong Kong.

Education
So holds a Bachelor of Arts degree in Economics from Carleton University and a double degree of Master of business administration and Bachelor of Laws from the University of Ottawa.

Early years
So moved to Canada at age 16, returning to Hong Kong in the 1980s. He got married and raised his family in Canada. So left Canada in the late 1990s, after working as a lawyer in Ontario, and returned to work in Hong Kong. As a senior government official, So no longer has Canadian citizenship.

Career

Professional career 
So is the senior partner of a solicitor's firm, member of the Hospital Authority, the Council of the Lingnan University, and the Commission on Strategic Development.

Political career 
So was the vice chairman of the Democratic Alliance for the Betterment and Progress of Hong Kong when he was appointed as Under Secretary. He resigned as the party's vice chairman then, but still maintain his membership.

Between 2000 and 2003, So served on the Wong Tai Sin District Council and the Tsz Wan Shan Area Committee.

In 2008 he was nominated Undersecretary for the Commerce and Economic Development under the 2008 Political Appointments System, at the 'cost'  of having to renounce his Canadian citizenship. "It was a tough decision. In doing so, I have also had to give up my legal practice qualification in Canada where I still have friends and relatives," he said

On 28 June 2011, So was appointed to succeed Rita Lau as Secretary for Commerce and Economic Development after she resigned for health reasons in April 2011.

On 6 May 2014, So's office and home received delivery of faeces after he told Hongkongers to tolerate incidents where Mainland visitors freely defecate and urinate on the streets of Hong Kong. So's comment came after a mainlander become violent to bystanders after they allowed their child to urinate in public in Hong Kong. Since receipt of the faeces delivery, So has also announced threats to the people responsible for stating their actions to be "very unwise."

Family 
His brother, Kevin So Kam-wai, was sentenced to more than 6 years in jail for money laundering.

References

Government officials of Hong Kong
Carleton University alumni
University of Ottawa alumni
Solicitors
District councillors of Wong Tai Sin District
Canadian people of Hong Kong descent
Democratic Alliance for the Betterment and Progress of Hong Kong politicians
Living people
1959 births